Louisville Memorial Auditorium, located at 970 South Fourth Street, is a concert venue of Greek Revival design. It was dedicated on Memorial Day, May 30, 1929, as a memorial to the people of Louisville who served in World War I. In 1954, the ceiling was lowered and the side balconies were closed off reducing the seating capacity from 2,349 to 1,742 to improve the acoustics.

Memorial Auditorium is home of the world's largest Pilcher organ and the largest operating theater organ in the region. This historic four-manual instrument with 5,288 pipes has been in operation since opening. The acoustic renovation all but completely closed off the pipe chambers from the renovated hall. It has been designated a landmark by the Louisville Metro Landmarks Commission and is on the National Register of Historic Places.

Although it is now used mainly by organizations for recitals, graduations, etc., it hosted many rock concerts in the 1960s and 1970s, including The Rolling Stones, Chicago, Bruce Springsteen, and Kiss.

References

Arts venues in Louisville, Kentucky
Music venues in Kentucky
Local landmarks in Louisville, Kentucky
National Register of Historic Places in Louisville, Kentucky
Carrère and Hastings buildings
Event venues on the National Register of Historic Places in Kentucky
1927 establishments in Kentucky
Beaux-Arts architecture in Kentucky
Event venues established in 1927